Acacia anceps, commonly known as Port Lincoln wattle or the two edged wattle, is a shrub belonging to the genus Acacia and the subgenus Phyllodineae.

Description
It blooms from September to February and produces yellow flowers. The phyllodes are thick and rigid with a linear to obovate shape. The solitary inflorescences are axillary with large globular flower heads. After flowering seed pods form that are red to brown in colour.

Distribution
It is native to an area along the south coast of the Goldfields-Esperance region of Western Australia and coastal areas of South Australia as far east as the Eyre Peninsula. It grows well in calcareous sandy soils and shallow red-brown sandy soils as a part of coastal dune vegetation or open scrub ecosystems.

Cultivation
The plant is used as an ornamental wattle that thrives in coastal locations and is planted as a windbreak. It can be propagated from seeds or from cuttings but needs well drained soils. It will tolerate full sun or part shade and is drought tolerant.

See also
List of Acacia species

References

anceps
Acacias of Western Australia
Plants described in 1825
Taxa named by Augustin Pyramus de Candolle